Aethriamanta circumsignata known as the square-spot basker is a species of dragonfly in the family Libellulidae. It is found in Australia, and New Guinea. The species is usually found near still or sluggish waters.

In northern Australia, it is found coastal and adjacent inland in an arc from Broome, Western Australia to around Coffs Harbour in New South Wales.

They are a small dragonfly with a wingspan of 40–60 mm, and predominantly red in colour. The wings have less venation than larger dragonflies, and few antenodal cross-veins. Adults may be found at some distance from water. The hindwing has a brown mark at the base which is squarish in shape, leading to its common name. The taxon has been assessed as being of least concern for the IUCN Red List.

Identification

The square-spot basker Aethriamanta circumsignata and L-spot basker Aethriamanta nymphaeae are very similar dragonflies and can be difficult to separate. The common name describes dark markings at the base of the hindwing of each species. 
The square-spot basker generally has two dark brown flecks. One radiates between the second and third vein (Sc and R) and the other radiates between the fourth and fifth vein (Cu and A). Below these flecks is a large dark squarish patch containing a small transparent wedge near the abdomen. A lighter brown surrounds the dark marks and may extend to the triangle and hindwing margin. Light brown marks may also exist at the base of the forewing.

Gallery

See also
 List of Odonata species of Australia

References

Libellulidae
Odonata of Asia
Odonata of Australia
Insects of Australia
Insects of New Guinea
Taxa named by Edmond de Sélys Longchamps
Insects described in 1897